Treasure Hunters: Peril at the Top of the World is a young adult children's literature adventure fiction book written by James Patterson with Chris Grabenstein. It is the fourth book in the Treasure Hunters series and the sequel to Treasure Hunters: Secret of the Forbidden City. It was published in 2016.

References

2016 American novels
Young adult novels by James Patterson
2016 children's books
Collaborative novels
Little, Brown and Company books